The 1980 Asian Invitational Badminton Championships which was the fourth edition of Asian Invitational Championships took place in the month of December in Bangkok, Thailand.

About 
This tourney was hosted by Badminton Association of Thailand, which was the member of now defunct World Badminton Federation (WBF). A total of 12 countries participated, which were Sri Lanka, Singapore, China, Brunei, South Korea, Thailand, Bangladesh, Pakistan, Hong Kong, Burma, Philippines and Nepal. Due to orders from International Badminton Federation (IBF), Asian countries which were members of IBF like Malaysia, Japan, India & Indonesia declined the participation as IBF and WBF were rival organisations at that time period.

There was a controversy when Malaysian players Ho Khim Soon & Teh Kew San competed in this tournament, without prior permission from Badminton Association of Malaysia even when Malaysian team didn't opt to participate in this tournament. As a result, both the players along with Ng Mei Ling were banned for one month by Penang Badminton Association from competing in any tournament.

Tournament didn't feature Mixed doubles event. China was dominant all through in the competition, with Thailand having two of its doubles combinations in finals. At the end China registered a clean sweep by winning all four individual titles.

Medalists

Semifinal results

Final results

References 

Badminton Asia Championships
Asian Badminton Championships
1980 Badminton Asia Championships
Badminton Asia Championships
Badminton Asia Championships